The Austrian Circle was an Imperial Circle of the Holy Roman Empire. It was one of the four Imperial Circles created by decree after the 1512 Diet at Cologne, twelve years after the original six Circles were established in the course of the Imperial Reform. It roughly corresponds to present-day Austria (except for Salzburg and Burgenland), Slovenia, and the Trentino-Alto Adige/Südtirol and Venezia Giulia regions of Northern Italy, but also comprised the Further Austrian territories in the former Swabian stem duchy.

Organisation

The Austrian Circle was largely coterminous with the "Hereditary Lands" (Erblande) of the House of Habsburg, dominated by the Archduchy of Austria. Beside the Habsburg lands, which had a single collective seat to the Reichstag, it included the Prince-Bishoprics of Trent and Brixen, which, however, were largely ruled within the Habsburg lands of Tyrol, and some little vassal principalities.

The Circle's territory was again enlarged with the acquisition of the Bavarian Innviertel according to the 1779 Treaty of Teschen, as well as the Electorate of Salzburg and the Berchtesgaden Provostry by the German mediatisation in 1803. Nevertheless, the Austrian Circle was dissolved when Emperor Francis II resigned on 6 August 1806.

Composition 
The circle was made up of the following states:

 
Circles of the Holy Roman Empire
1512 establishments in the Holy Roman Empire